David Ferriol (born 24 April 1979) is a French former professional rugby league footballer. He previously played for the Catalans Dragons club in the Super League.

Background
Ferriol was born in Carcassonne, France.

Career
A powerful, ball-carrying prop forward, Ferriol made his Catalans debut in the 2007 season and quickly became a crowd favourite amongst the Dragons faithful. He had previously played for the Limoux Grizzlies in the French Elite Championship.

References

External links
Super League profile

1979 births
People from Carcassonne
French rugby league players
Catalans Dragons players
France national rugby league team players
Living people
Rugby league props
Sportspeople from Aude